The Midtown Historic District in St. Louis, Missouri is a historic district that was listed on the U.S. National Register of Historic Places in 1978.

It includes 94 contributing buildings on a  area.  The Moolah Temple, designed by Helfensteller, Hirsch and Watson is one of the contributing buildings.

References

Victorian architecture in Missouri
Gothic Revival architecture in Missouri
Historic districts on the National Register of Historic Places in Missouri
National Register of Historic Places in St. Louis
Midtown St. Louis